Vyatka may refer to:
Vyatka, former name of the city of Kirov, Kirov Oblast, Russia
Vyatka (river), a river in Russia
Vyatka Region, an informal name of Kirov Oblast of Russia
Vyatka (motor scooter), a Russian copy of Italy's Vespa Motor Scooter
Vyatka (horse), a sturdy breed of workhorse from the Vyatka Region